is a Japanese surname. It may also refer to:

 , Japanese footballer
 , Japanese footballer
 Mukojima islands, a subgroup of the Bonin Islands
 Mukojima, one of the Mukojima islands
 Mukojima, a former ward that's now part of the special ward of Sumida, Tokyo, Japan

Japanese-language surnames